Paul Veltrup (born March 6, 2001, in Grefrath, Germany) is a German fencer who fences for the Fecht Club Krefeld. At the Youth Olympic Games 2018 in Buenos Aires he won the silver medal in boy's épée.

Career

National Championships 
Veltrup won the German Championships in 2016 (cadets) and 2018 (juniors).

European Championships 

 2016 (Novi Sad, Serbia): 10th place (cadets team), 65th place (cadets individual)
 2017 (Plovdiv, Bulgaria): 6th place (cadets team), 39th place (cadets individual)
 2018 (Sochi, Russia): 2nd place (cadets team), 3rd place (cadets individual), 11th place (juniors individual), 11th place (juniors team)

World Championships 

 2016 (Bourges, France): 31st place (cadets individual)
2017 (Plovdiv, Bulgaria): 57th place (cadets individual)
2018 (Verona, Italy): 9th place (cadets individual), 16th place (juniors team), 54th place (juniors individual)

Youth Olympic Games 
Veltrup started at the Youth Olympics in Buenos Aires in the individual competition in épée on October 8, 2018. He was first after the pool round. In the quarter-finals, he won against Isaac Herbst (USA) 13:12, in the semi-final against Kyrgyz Khasan Baudunov 15:12. The final lost Veltrup with 4:11 against World and European champion Davide Di Veroli from Italy. His silver medal was the first for the German team at the Youth Olympics.

Two days after Veltrup won the silver medal in the individual competition, he started for the team Europe 2 in the mixed team competition and took the 6th place.

References

External links 

 Paul Veltrup - FIE
 Paul Veltrup - buenosaires2018.com
 Paul Veltrup - fencing.ophardt.online

2001 births
Living people
German male fencers
German épée fencers
Fencers at the 2018 Summer Youth Olympics
Medalists at the 2018 Summer Youth Olympics
Sportspeople from Düsseldorf (region)
21st-century German people
Left-handed fencers
People from Viersen (district)